Giovanni d’Aniello (born 5 January 1955) is an Italian prelate of the Catholic Church who works in the diplomatic service of the Holy See. An archbishop since 2001, he was appointed Apostolic Nuncio to the Russian Federation on 1 June 2020. He has been apostolic nuncio or apostolic delegate to the Democratic Republic of the Congo, Thailand, Cambodia, Burma and Laos, and Brazil.

Biography
Born in Aversa in the Campania Region of Italy on 5 January 1955, d'Aniello studied at the local seminary and was ordained a priest on 8 December 1978.

He obtained a doctorate in canon law. To prepare for a diplomatic career, he entered the Pontifical Ecclesiastical Academy in 1979. He joined the diplomatic service of the Holy See on 1 June 1983 and his early postings took him to Burundi, Thailand, Lebanon, and Brazil. He also worked in Rome in the Section for Relations with the States of the Secretariat of State of the Holy See, where he had responsibility for the Middle East. 

On 15 December 2001, Pope John Paul II appointed him titular archbishop of Paestum and Pontifical Representative to the Democratic Republic of the Congo. He received his episcopal consecration on 6 January 2002 from Pope John Paul. His title was changed to Apostolic Nuncio on 12 January 2002.

On 22 September 2010, Pope Benedict XVI named him Nuncio to both Thailand and Cambodia as well as Apostolic Delegate to both Myanmar and Laos. In March 2011, on a visit with Burmese refugees at a camp in Thailand he offered support and said that the "Church’s work for refugees is an essential work of the Church".

On 10 February 2012, he was named Apostolic Nuncio to Brazil.

On 1 June 2020, Pope Francis appointed him Apostolic Nuncio to the Russian Federation.

See also
 List of heads of the diplomatic missions of the Holy See

References

External links
 Catholic Hierarchy: Archbishop Giovanni d’Aniello 
Diplomatic Relations of the Holy See

1955 births
Living people
People from Aversa
Pontifical Ecclesiastical Academy alumni
21st-century Italian Roman Catholic titular archbishops
Apostolic Nuncios to the Democratic Republic of the Congo
Apostolic Nuncios to Thailand
Apostolic Nuncios to Cambodia
Apostolic Nuncios to Brazil
Apostolic Nuncios to Myanmar
Apostolic Nuncios to Laos
Apostolic Nuncios to Russia